Soest (as if it were 'Sohst'; Westphalian: Saust) is a city in North Rhine-Westphalia, Germany. It is the capital of the Soest district.

Geography

Neighbouring places
Bad Sassendorf
Ense
Lippetal
Möhnesee
Werl
Welver

Legends
The Norwegian Þiðrekssaga from the 13th century, a series of tales about the Gothic King Theoderic the Great, identifies Soest (called Susat) as the capital of Attila's (?–453) Hunnic Empire. The actual location of Attila's capital has not been determined.

History
Owing to its fertile soil (predominantly brown silty clay loam), the area around Soest is believed to have been settled well before the village is first mentioned in the Dagobertsche Schenkung in 836. Excavations in recent decades have uncovered signs of habitation stretching back more than 4000 years. During the 11th and 12th centuries Soest grew considerably, making it one of the largest towns in Westphalia with some 10,000 citizens. It was also, until 1609, an important member of the Hanseatic League.

In the geographical work Atar Al-Belad composed by Iranian scholar Mohammad Qazvini (1203-1283), Soest is described for its salt production and referred to as "Slavic country": “There is a salty spring, while there is no salt to be found in the surroundings. When people make salt they take water from the spring, filling a kettle and placing it in an oven made from stone, lighting a large fire underneath, turning it into a thick and murky fluid. Then it is left to cool, leaving solid white salt. In this manner all white salt is produced in the Slavic countries”

An increasingly confident and powerful Soest liberated itself, between 1444 and 1449, from the Bishop of Cologne, who controlled Westphalia (the so-called Soest Feud). No longer a capital of Westphalia, Soest aligned itself instead with the Duke of Cleves. This proved to be mostly a Pyrrhic victory, however. Though it had shown itself strong enough to defy the powerful Archbishop of Cologne, the town lost much of its trade as a consequence, with a "liberated" Soest surrounded by territories with other allegiances. When the last Duke of Cleves died in 1609, his dukedom was inherited by Brandenburg and, after a short siege, Soest was incorporated into it.

The painter Peter Lely, later to win fame in England, was born in 1618 in Soest to Dutch parents, where his father was an officer serving in the armed forces of Elector Johann Sigismund of Brandenburg.

During and after the Thirty Years' War, Soest suffered a tremendous loss of both population and influence; at its lowest point, in 1756, having merely 3,600 citizens.

With the creation of the Soest district in 1817, its influence again began to rise. However, the industrialization of the Ruhr area throughout the 19th century did not reach Soest, which remained a small town.

Under the re-drawing of political borders within the Reich by the Nazi Party Soest was placed in Gau Westphalia-South. During World War II, Soest was the target of several allied bomber raids targeting the marshalling yard, one of the biggest in the Reich, and the important battery factory Akku Hagen. In early April 1945, Soest suffered from major fighting as Allied forces captured the town. Though retaken by a German counterattack shortly thereafter, destructive front-line combat continued to rage in Soest and its environs at the eastern edge of the Ruhr Pocket until the Allies ultimately gained permanent control.

From 1953 to 1971, a sizable garrison of Canadian soldiers and their families was stationed at Soest (with the Canadian camps located just east of the town in Bad Sassendorf), as well as at Werl and Hemer-Iserlohn and Deilinghofen to the southwest. In addition, an American Nike Battery (66th Battalion) was situated just south of the town, and was subsequently turned over to the German military.

From 1971 to 1993, the former Canadian properties, including the Married Quarters along Hiddingser Weg, south of the B-1, were used and occupied by British military personnel and their families. With the eventual closure of the Belgian and British army facilities, many of these properties were re-purposed for civilian use, abandoned, or demolished. The former Married Quarters area was converted to civilian housing. The former CANEX (the Canadian Army's food and clothing store for NATO families) was converted to a NAAFI under the British and finally demolished in 2006.

Education
The city is home to a major branch of the South Westphalia University of Applied Sciences (also: Fachhochschule Südwestfalen (FH SWF)) which offers various engineering, and Business Administration programmes.

Sights
Soest has a multitude of historical buildings and attractions. The many medieval churches are built from a greenish sandstone unique to this area.

St. Patroclus

In 960, Bruno I, Archbishop of Cologne transferred relics of St. Patroclus from Troyes to Soest. From 964 on, they have been housed in what became the provost church St.-Patrokli-Dom (St. Patroclus' "Cathedral"), a particularly fine example of Romanesque architecture.

The cathedral is an example of early medieval Romanesque architecture fashioned from the local greenish sandstone. Its massive squared bell tower or steeple can be seen for many kilometres, rising up out of the city centre of the old town and a landmark of the Soester Boerde.

Allerheiligenkirmes
The Allerheiligenkirmes is named for All Saints' Day as it starts every year at the first Wednesday after All Saints' and lasts for five days. It is Europe's biggest inner-city fair and was held for the 673rd time in 2010.

Specialties of Soest
Among the traditional specialties of Soest are Möppken bread and pumpernickel. The Haverland bakery in the city centre, which formerly supplied the dark bread to the royal court of Bavaria, has existed since 1570. A more recent specialty is Bullenauge (Bull's Eye), a mocha liqueur, sold mostly at the Allerheiligenkirmes. Another specialty is the Soester beer, also known as Zwiebel-Bier (Onion Beer) as it has been brewed, since 1993, in the Zwiebel (Onion) Inn.

Coat of arms
The town's coat of arms shows a key, which is the symbol for Saint Peter, the patron saint of Cologne. The key symbol remained unchanged, even after Soest no longer fell within the jurisdiction of Cologne.

Twin towns – sister cities

Soest is twinned with:

 Bangor, Wales
 Gotland, Sweden
 Guérard, France
 Herzberg, Germany
 Kampen, Netherlands
 Mishawaka, Indiana, United States
 Sárospatak, Hungary
 Soest, Netherlands
 Strzelce Opolskie, Poland

Notable people

Johannes von Soest (1448–1506), composer, theorist and poet
Johann Gropper (1503–1559), Catholic church politician of the Reformation period
Peter Lely (1618–1680), Dutch-English painter.
August Meineke (1790–1870), German classical scholar.
Heinrich von Sybel (18171895), historian
Otto Modersohn (1865–1943), landscape painter
Sigfrid Henrici (1889–1964), army officer of armoured forces
Wilhelm Morgner (1891–1917), Expressionist painter
 (1895–1960), member of parliament (CDU)
Hartwig Bleidick (born 1944), footballer
Ralf König (born 1960),  known comic book creator
Sascha Schmitz (born 1972), singer-songwriter and actor
Sebastian Hille (born 1980), footballer
Oliver Kirch (born 1982), footballer
Michael Lejan (born 1983), footballer
Rebecca Handke (born 1986), pair skater
Gaëtan Bille (born 1988), Belgian cyclist
Julian Büscher (born 1993), footballer

Gallery

References

External links

Official website 
Articles about "Aldegrever and the Protestant Reformation in Soest" / virtual exhibition "Iconoclastic Controversy and sensual pleasure - Heinrich Aldegrever" with introductory texts and about 170 commented copperplate engravings 
Skydive Soest - Germany's largest weekend dropzone 

1609 disestablishments
States and territories established in 1449
Towns in North Rhine-Westphalia
Members of the Hanseatic League
Soest (district)